Greater Moncton is the area encompassing Moncton, Dieppe, and Riverview in New Brunswick, Canada.

See also
List of tallest buildings in Moncton

References 

 
Moncton